Clear Creek State Park is a  Pennsylvania state park in Barnett and Heath Townships, Jefferson County, Pennsylvania in the United States. Public campsites were first opened at the park in 1922. Many of the facilities seen today at the park were constructed during the Great Depression by the Civilian Conservation Corps.

Recreation
Clear Creek State Park is open to many recreational opportunities. One such trail leads to Bear Town Rocks, a group of large boulders in the middle of the forest, from the top of which one can get a scenic view of the surrounding area. The park has extensive picnic facilities and is open to hunting and fishing and serves as a launch point for canoeing on the Clarion River.

About  of Clear Creek State Park are open to hunting. Hunters may park at the park to gain access to the surrounding Kitanning State Forest. Common game species are white-tailed deer, black bear, turkey, and squirrels. The hunting of groundhogs is prohibited. All hunters are expected to follow the rules and regulations of the Pennsylvania Game Commission.

Clear Creek has a native and stocked population of brook trout. The Clarion River also has some trout, panfish and smallmouth bass. Some of the small tributaries of Clear Creek and the Clarion River are also stocked with trout by the Pennsylvania Fish and Boat Commission.

The Clarion River is a popular destination for canoeing enthusiasts. They commonly launch their canoes at Clear Creek State Park for the 4 and a half hour trip to Cook Forest State Park. Canoes are available to rent from various outfitters in the area.

Accommodations

Cabins and Mongolian style yurts are available for rent to visitors interested in spending more than a day at Clear Creek State Park. Twenty-two rustic cabins built by the Civilian Conservation Corps can be rented on a weekly basis beginning with the opening of trout season in April and ending at the conclusion of deer season in December. The cabins are heated with either a wood stove or a propane heater. The two yurts have electric heat. Both the cabins and yurts have minimal accommodations. Single bunk beds, tables, chairs, an electric range, refrigerator and lights are provided. There is a centrally located shower area with frost free water spigots for drinking water.

The campground opens and closes with the cabins and yurts. Fifty-three trailer and tent sites are available for use. The rustic campground is located in the woods with outhouses and a sanitary dump station. There is a 9-hole disc golf course and a concrete basketball court next to the campground.

Nearby state parks
The following state parks are within  of Clear Creek State Park:
Bendigo State Park (Elk County)
Chapman State Park (Warren County)
Cook Forest State Park (Clarion County, Jefferson, and Forest Counties)
Oil Creek State Park (Venango County)

References

External links

  

State parks of Pennsylvania
Protected areas established in 1922
Civilian Conservation Corps in Pennsylvania
Parks in Jefferson County, Pennsylvania
Campgrounds in Pennsylvania
1922 establishments in Pennsylvania
Protected areas of Jefferson County, Pennsylvania